Bernam River Airfield  is an airport located in Hulu Selangor District, Selangor, Malaysia.

Bernam River Airfield (BRA) is the first private airpark in the country. The recent increase in air traffic at the Subang Airport and the imminent closure of the Sungei Besi Air Base (WMKF) has accelerated the need for an alternative site for light aircraft to operate.

References

External links

Bernam River Air Field Facebook Group

Airports in Selangor
Hulu Selangor District